Alexander William Angus (11 November 1889 – 23 March 1947) was a Scottish international rugby union and cricket player.

Rugby Union career

Amateur career

He played club rugby for Watsonians.

Provincial career

He played for Edinburgh District against Glasgow District in the 1910 inter-city match. Edinburgh won the match 26–5, with Angus scoring a try.

He played for the Whites Trial side against the Blues Trial side on 21 January 1911, while still with Watsonians. He scored a drop goal in a 26–19 win for the Whites.

International career

He was capped eighteen for the  rugby union team between 1909 and 1920.

Richard Bath mentions him as one of the three Scottish players "who've gone the longest without (between) scoring a try for Scotland" along with Alan Tait and Gary Armstrong. This is partly because World War I occurred in the middle of his international career, a period in which all international rugby ceased. He was first capped in 1909, scoring two tries in fourteen matches before the Great War. His next four caps came in 1920, and he scored against  on 28 February 1920 – just over nine years since his previous try. Scotland won that match 19–0.

Cricket career

He also played for the Scotland national cricket team.

See also
 List of Scottish cricket and rugby union players
 Jock Wemyss and Charlie Usher, other players capped on both sides of the war.

References

Sources

 Bath, Richard (ed.) The Scotland Rugby Miscellany (Vision Sports Publishing Ltd, 2007 )
 Massie, Allan A Portrait of Scottish Rugby (Polygon, Edinburgh)

1889 births
1947 deaths
Cricketers from Sydney
Scottish rugby union players
Scotland international rugby union players
Scottish cricketers
Watsonians RFC players
Rugby union players from Sydney
Whites Trial players
Edinburgh District (rugby union) players
Rugby union centres